The diademed sifaka (Propithecus diadema), or diademed simpona, is an endangered species of sifaka, one of the lemurs endemic to certain rainforests in eastern Madagascar. Along with the indri, this species is one of the two largest living lemurs, with an average weight of 6.5 kg and a total adult length of approximately 105 centimetres (41 inches), half of which is its tail. Russell Mittermeier, one of the contemporary authorities on lemurs, describes the diademed sifaka as "one of the most colorful and attractive of all the lemurs", having a long and silky coat. P. diadema is also known by the Malagasy names simpona, simpony and ankomba joby. The term "diademed sifaka" is also used as a group species designation formerly encompassing four distinct subspecies.

Description

P. diadema is readily distinguished from all the other lemur species by its characteristic markings and large physical size. Its entire coat is moderately long, silky and luxuriant. The long white fur encircling his muzzle and covering its cheeks, forehead and chin, engenders the "diadem" or crown appearance. Its eyes are a reddish brown, the muzzle is short, and the face is bare with colourisation of darkish gray to jet black. The crown fur is also quite black and often extends to the nape of the neck. The upper back and shoulder fur are slate grayish, although the lower back is lighter in colour attaining a silvery quality. Flanks and tail are a paler gray, sometimes even white, as is the case for ventral fur. Hands and feet are entirely black, while arms, legs and base of tail are a yellowish-golden hue. Only the male is endowed with a large cutaneous gland at the exterior center of the throat, which feature is typically reddish brown.

Range and habitat

The diademed sifaka is one of the mostly widely distributed member of the genus Propithecus, although definitive mapping of its range has not been conducted. The species occurs from 200 to 800 metres (656 to 2,624 feet) elevation throughout much of the eastern Madagascar lowland forests, and from 800 to 1,550 metres (2,624 to 5,084 feet) in portions of the montane Madagascar subhumid forests. These two ecoregions have been designated as a Global 200 ecoregion, one of the world's most significant regions for conservation. Geographically the range extends to at least the Mananara River in the north to the Onive and Mongoro Rivers in the south. One set of researchers has recorded a clinal variation between Propithecus diadema and Propithecus edwardsi in the extreme southern portion of the range. As with all Indriidae, this species and its entire genus have evolved on the island of Madagascar independent of other mainland African species.

An anomalous outlier population of P. diadema has been discovered in south central Madagascar; the members of this population exhibit an array of different colour markings, including at least one observation of an all black lemur. DNA analyses have not resulted in consistent results as to whether this group of individuals should constitute a new species. Scientists have decided to classify this outlier group as P. diadema until further research warrants designation of a separate species.

Specific locations for sighting the diademed sifaka are Mantadia National Park (approximately three hours in driving time from the capital city of Antananarivo) and in the forests of Tsinjoarivo.

Behaviour

The diademed sifaka forms groups typically of two to ten individuals, which may include multiple male and female adults. Each troop defends an exclusive home territory of 25 to 50 hectares (62 to 125 acres) using perimeter scent territorial marking by both the males and females.  Although the diademed sifaka defends the group's territory strongly against other members of their same species, it will share territory with other species such as the red-bellied lemur and the common brown lemur. P. diadema is thought to traverse the greatest daily path distance relative to other members of its family in its patrolling and foraging, attaining a typical travel distance in excess of 1.6 kilometres (one mile) per day. To accomplish this it consumes a diet high in energy content and diverse in plant content, each day consuming over 25 different vegetative species.  This diurnal lemur further diversifies its diet by consuming not only fruits, but certain flowers, seeds and verdant leaves, in proportions that vary by season.

For a large lemur, the diademed sifaka is rather athletic, being capable of lateral aerial propulsion of up to 30 kilometers per hour, a result of muscular leg thrusting action pushing off from a vertical tree trunk. It is possible, although not proven, that its vigorous health characteristics are enhanced from high consumption of two plants which contain high concentrations of alkaloids. This species is arboreal, and only rarely are seen on the ground; moreover, it is a vertical clinger and lateral leaper.

The diademed sifaka makes a warning call resembling the sound "kiss-sneeze" when a terrestrial predator is perceived;  the sole terrestrial predators of P. diadema are the fossa and Nile crocodile.

Sexual maturity occurs after age two or three, with the male maturing somewhat more slowly than the female. Little is known of mating behaviour; however, it is believed that the female is receptive to mating only a few days per year. Being dominant, the female has the greatest input to mate selection. Copulation occurs in the summer (around December), and the expected number of births is one offspring per female per annum.

Conservation issues
The diademed sifaka is classified as critically endangered on the IUCN Red List, and is listed in CITES Appendix I. As of the year 2002, population estimates for the species range between 6,000 and 10,000 individuals. The primary threat is habitat reduction due to shifting cultivation by native peoples.  This threat is also present even within designated national parks, which are sufficiently distant from the center of government, that enforcement of existing national laws protecting P. diadema habitat is problematic. Pressures of population growth in central and eastern Madagascar are causing many of the rural poor to seek subsistence by seizing whatever forest lands are available and undertaking slash-and-burn tactics as their initial step in a shifting cultivation system.  Returns from such land use are usually meager, yielding small amounts of charcoal, firewood or grass crop for grazing of zebu.

Classification
The diademed sifaka and three other sifaka species form a tight species group within the genus Propithecus. The other three species are Milne-Edwards' sifaka (Propithecus edwardsi), Perrier's sifaka (P. perrieri), and the silky sifaka (P. candidus). All of these species have luxuriant silky coats and are powerful leapers. They share similar characteristics of gestation length (four months), age of sexual maturity, female dominance, life expectancy (18 years) and propensity for sunbathing while stretched out on a branch. They differ distinctly in colouration and markings, except for having universally totally black faces.

References

External links

 University of Michigan fact sheet for diademed sifaka
 Primate Info Net Eastern Sifakas Factsheet

Sifakas
Mammals of Madagascar
Critically endangered fauna of Africa
Mammals described in 1832
Fauna of the Madagascar subhumid forests
Madagascar lowland forests
Taxa named by Edward Turner Bennett